Jagielka is a Polish surname. Notable people with the surname include:

 Phil Jagielka (born 1982), English footballer
 Steve Jagielka (1978–2021), English footballer

See also
 Jagielski

Polish-language surnames